Jhpiego is a nonprofit organization for international health affiliated with Johns Hopkins University. The group was founded in 1973 and initially called the Johns Hopkins Program for International Education in Gynecology and Obstetrics, but is now referred to simply as Jhpiego (pronounced "ja-pie-go").

Current program areas

In its early years, Jhpiego was recognized as an expert in reproductive health and family planning. As the organization has grown and become more field-based, its programming areas have grown and expanded. As of 2015, Jhpiego's primary program areas are:
 Maternal, newborn, and child health
 Family planning and reproductive health
 HIV/AIDS prevention and care
 Infection prevention and control
 Malaria prevention and treatment
 Cervical cancer prevention and treatment
 Tuberculosis (TB)
 Urban and community health
 Education and training
 Innovations

Work in different continents

Jhpiego currently works in 36 countries throughout Africa, Asia, Latin America and the Caribbean.

Africa

As of 2015, Jhpiego is actively working in 26 African countries:

Asia, Near East and Europe

As of 2015, Jhpiego is actively working in 9 Asian countries:

Latin America and the Caribbean
As of 2015, Jhpiego is actively working in one Latin American/Caribbean country:

References

External links
 Jhpiego Web Site

International medical and health organizations
Malaria organizations
Medical and health organizations based in Maryland
Johns Hopkins University